Bampton is a village and civil parish in the Eden District of Cumbria, England, on the edge of the Lake District National Park.   It is in the historic county of Westmorland. The parish had a population of 283 according to the 2001 census. In the 2011 census Bampton was grouped with Martindale to give a total of 373. The parish includes the villages of Bampton, Bampton Grange and Bomby.

Bampton Grammar school was founded in 17th century when the industrial population was comparatively large.  Depopulation reduced the necessity leading to the budgetary axe to fall on school provision.  Until 2005 Bampton had a village school, which closed due to lack of children.

Haweswater Beck arises as a stream discharge from Haweswater Reservoir and flows eastward, just north of Firth Woods, and then turns north to join the River Lowther between Bampton and Bampton Grange.

The village of Bampton centres on Bampton Village Store Bed & Breakfast, The Mardale Inn, Village Hall, playground, garage and caravan site. The Mardale Inn was bought as a Community Pub in May 2022 by Bampton Valley Community Pub, a Community Benefit Society comprising over 500 Shareholder Members.  

In Bampton Grange is St Patrick's Church, Bampton and the Crown and Mitre Inn (currently closed to non-residents).

Also within the village of Bampton is the traditional red telephone box used in the 1987 cult classic movie Withnail & I.

There is a book called Ploughing in Latin that has been written about Bampton and one called Cast Iron Community about Burnbanks, the village built to house the Haweswater dam-builders.

See also

Listed buildings in Bampton, Cumbria
 List of English and Welsh endowed schools (19th century)

References

External links

  Cumbria County History Trust: Bampton (nb: provisional research only - see Talk page)
Bampton Parish web site
St Patrick's Church, Bampton
Bampton and District History Society
Bampton
Bampton Village Store Bed & Breakfast

 
Villages in Cumbria
Westmorland
Civil parishes in Cumbria
Eden District